Pleasant Valley is an unincorporated community in Calvert County, Maryland, United States.

References

Unincorporated communities in Calvert County, Maryland
Unincorporated communities in Maryland